A referendum on a law on part-time work was held in Slovenia on 10 April 2011. The law was rejected by 80% of voters.

Background
On 26 October 2012 the National Assembly passed a law on part-time work by a vote of 39 to 32. However, it was then rejected by the National Council by a vote of 20 to 14 on 2 November. The National Assembly approved the law again by a vote of 47 to 28 on 16 November. The National Council then attempted to force a referendum on the law, but although the motion passed 18–7 in favour, at least 21 votes were required.

The law would allow unemployed people, students and pensioners to work for up to 60 hours a month and 720 hours a year. However, they would be paid less and have fewer employment rights, including no right to reimbursement for meals at work and commuting costs, as well as no sick or parental leave. They would also get no annual leave entitlement and no severance pay. 

The ŠOS student organisation and the Association of Free Trade Unions of Slovenia (ZSSS) both opposed the new law, as it would create a new class of employees who received fewer social benefits. Between 3 January and 6 February 2011 the ŠOS and the ZSSS collected 47,000 signatures, more than the 40,000 required to hold a referendum under article 90 of the Slovenian constitution. As a result, the National Assembly fixed the date for a referendum on 17 February.

Results

References

2011 referendums
2011 in Slovenia
Referendums in Slovenia
April 2011 events in Europe